An Anarchist Woman is a 1909 novel by Hutchins Hapgood.

Bibliography 

 
 
 
 
 
 
 
 Mother Earth

External links 

 

1909 American novels
Books about anarchism